The omnigenic model of the genetics of complex traits posits that human gene regulatory networks are so interconnected that thousands of individual genes contribute at least slightly to the phenotype through expression in relevant cells. Because it proposes that the genetic architecture of complex traits is affected by a large number of genes, it is similar to the infinitesimal model developed by Ronald Fisher. It also incorporates the concept of "universal pleiotropy", which states that genetic variation in one part of the genome can potentially have an indirect effect on any other trait. The model was first proposed by Boyle et al. in a 2017 paper in Cell. According to this model, a small number of "core genes" with biological relevance to a given trait, as well as their regulators and associated pathways, contribute to complex human traits. "Peripheral" genes are also said to far outnumber core genes for a trait, and to contribute to much more of its heritability, despite being outside of the key pathways associated with the trait.

References

Statistical genetics